The 2003 E3 Prijs Vlaanderen was the 46th edition of the E3 Harelbeke cycle race and was held on 29 March 2003. The race started and finished in Harelbeke. The race was won by Steven de Jongh of the Rabobank team.

General classification

References

2003 in Belgian sport
2003